Luis Eduardo Gaspar Coelho (born 31 July 2002), commonly known as Gaspar, is a Brazilian footballer who plays as a forward for FC Cascavel, on loan from Avaí.

Club career
Gaspar was born in Várzea Grande, Mato Grosso, and joined Avaí's youth setup in August 2019, from Atlético Tubarão. He made his first team – and Série A – debut on 5 November, coming on as a late substitute for Pablo Dyego in a 1–1 away draw against Santos.

Career statistics

References

2002 births
Living people
Sportspeople from Mato Grosso
Brazilian footballers
Association football forwards
Campeonato Brasileiro Série A players
Avaí FC players